Tuam was a borough constituency which elected two MPs representing Tuam, County Galway, to the Irish House of Commons, the house of representatives of the Kingdom of Ireland. It was incorporated by a 1614 charter of James I. It originally belonged to the Church of Ireland Archbishop of Tuam, before later passing into the control of the Clanmorris branch of the Bingham family. It was disenfranchised by the Acts of Union 1800.

Members of Parliament

Notes

References

Constituencies of the Parliament of Ireland (pre-1801)
Historic constituencies in County Galway
Tuam
1800 disestablishments in Ireland
Constituencies disestablished in 1800